IJsboerke was a Belgian professional cycling team that existed from 1973 to 1982. Its main sponsor from 1973 to 1980 was Belgian ice cream manufacturer . In 1981 and 1982, its main sponsor was juice drink brand Capri-Sun. Walter Godefroot won the 1978 Tour of Flanders with the team.

References

Cycling teams based in Belgium
Defunct cycling teams based in Belgium
1973 establishments in Belgium
1982 disestablishments in Belgium
Cycling teams established in 1973
Cycling teams disestablished in 1981